Fujerd (also Romanized as Fūjerd) is a village in Estarabad-e Shomali Rural District, Baharan District, Gorgan County, Golestan Province, Iran. At the 2006 census, its population was 1,226, in 298 families.

References 

Populated places in Gorgan County